Coutts Inlet is a body of water in Nunavut's Qikiqtaaluk Region. It is an arm of Baffin Bay in northeastern Baffin Island. The inlet flows in a southwestern direction and includes a northern arm that juts off the main inlet close to the mouth. Nova Zembla Island and Round Island are located near the mouth of Coutts Inlet.

The inlet is frequented by narwhals.

References

Inlets of Baffin Island